Bonnie Brier Bush may refer to:

"There grows a bonnie brier bush in our Kailyard", a Scottish folk song 
Beside the Bonnie Brier Bush, a book of Scottish shorts stories by Ian Maclaren
Theatrical performances based on the book
1901 performance produced by Kirke La Shelle
1903 play that was Mabel Brownell's debut 
1905 play produced by Lettice Fairfax
 The Bonnie Brier Bush, a 1921 film